Caecina may refer to:

 Caecinia gens, an ancient Roman family
 Caecina (genus), a genus of assassin bugs
 Caecina, a synonym for Porphyrogenes, a genus of butterflies
 Cecina, Tuscany, Italy

See also
 Cecina (disambiguation)